Brickellia is a North American genus of about 100 to 110 species of plants in the family Asteraceae, known commonly as brickellbushes. They are found in Canada, the United States, Mexico, and Central America.  Many species are native to the American southwest, especially Texas. Brickellia is among the more basal lineages of the Eupatorieae and should not be assigned to a subtribe pending further research.

They are mostly woody perennial shrubs. Some species have a very strong pleasant scent, while others smell distasteful. All contain high amounts of essential oils. Germacrene D, a natural insecticide, is found in B. veronicifolia and probably other species, if not all.

Despite their chemical defenses, brickellbushes are food for caterpillars of certain Lepidoptera. These include the noctuid moths Schinia trifascia, Schinia oleagina, which is known only from Brickellia, Schinia buta, which is only known from B. californica, and Schinia gracilenta, which is only known from B. eupatorioides.

The genus is named for John Brickell, 1748–1809, Irish-born physician and naturalist

Classification 
The genera Brickelliastrum (United States and Mexico), Asanthus (United States and Mexico), Dyscritogyne (Mexico), and Steviopsis have been separated from Brickellia by many 20th century authors (and all four combined into Steviopsis by some). Their correct placement is still debated, but molecular phylogenetic analysis has provided evidence that Brickelliastrum, Asanthus, and Steviopsis (including Dyscritogyne, which is not distinct from Steviopsis) represent distinct lineages, and should be recognized as separate from Brickellia, while [Kuhnia], [Barroetea] and [Phanerostylis] should be treated as synonyms.

Species

References

External links

 
Flora of Central America
Flora of North America
Asteraceae genera
Taxa named by Stephen Elliott